Dutchess Manor was a restaurant and catering hall located along NY 9D in the Town of Fishkill, New York, United States, between the city of Beacon and Breakneck Ridge. It is one of the most distinctive Hudson Valley buildings in the Second Empire architectural style, and was added to the National Register of Historic Places in 1982. In 2020, the building was purchased by Hudson Highlands Fjord Trail, a nonprofit organization behind the planning of a 7.5-mile linear park in the Hudson Highlands.

Francis Timoney, an Irish immigrant, built the house in 1889 of bricks his three yards had made from clay found along the east bank of the Hudson River just below it. The nearby New York Central Water Level Route gave him and the other brickmakers in the area easy access to New York City and other area markets, allowing him to do well enough to build the estate. It has many common elements of the Second Empire style, such as quoining on the corners and a mansard roof.

The building was converted into a restaurant starting in the 1940s, with the upper floors used for managerial and residential purposes. It was until 2020 a popular site in the area for functions, especially weddings, due to the views of the river and nearby Hudson Highlands available from the property. The south and west wings were extended to accommodate diners and are no longer considered historic elements of the property. A nearby carriage house built by Timoney, now converted to apartments, has not been altered as much and is considered a contributing property.

Hudson Highlands Fjord Trail will adapt the building as its future visitor center, projected to open in 2025.

References

External links

Houses on the National Register of Historic Places in New York (state)
Restaurants in New York (state)
Hudson River
Second Empire architecture in New York (state)
Houses completed in 1889
Fishkill, New York
National Register of Historic Places in Dutchess County, New York
Houses in Dutchess County, New York